Janelia Farm may refer to:

 Janelia Research Campus of the Howard Hughes Medical Institute, formally known as "Janelia Farm Research Campus"
 Janelia, a historic home located on the Janelia Research Campus